Idaho City is a city in and the county seat of Boise County, Idaho, United States, located about  northeast of Boise. The population was 485 at the 2010 census, up from 458 in 2000.

Idaho City is part of the Boise City−Nampa, Idaho Metropolitan Statistical Area.

History
Idaho City was founded in December 1862 as “Bannock” (sometimes given as “West Bannock”), amidst the Boise Basin gold rush during the Civil War, the largest since the California gold rush a dozen years earlier. Near the confluence of Elk and Mores Creeks, its plentiful water supply allowed it to outgrow the other nearby camps in the basin, such as Placerville, Pioneerville, and Centerville. As its population swelled, the new Idaho Territorial legislature changed the town's name to “Idaho City,” to avoid confusion with Bannack, in present-day Beaverhead County, the southwestern corner of Montana.

At its peak during the mid-1860s, there were more than 200 businesses in town, including three dozen saloons and two dozen law offices. Its 1864 population of 7,000 made it the largest city in the Northwest, bigger than Portland. Wood was the prime source of both shelter and heat, which caused Idaho City to burn four times: 1865, 1867, 1868, and 1871. Five businesses on Main Street burned again in the early hours of June 5, 2015.

In 1863, St. Joseph's Catholic Church was established; it was the first Catholic parish in the new Idaho Territory and the church was completed the following year.

Idaho City is an important location in local Masonic history. The Grand Lodge of Idaho was founded in Idaho City in 1867. Idaho Lodge No. 1 was originally located in Idaho City, but is now in Boise.

During the boom, the greater Boise Basin population numbered in the tens of thousands, but most departed the mountains once mining declined. Idaho City's population fell below 900 by 1870 and was down to 104 by 1920. The modern economy relies mainly on hunting and fishing tourism, and visits to the many historic sites, including the Boot Hill Cemetery. Outside of town, the mining tailings of the era are ubiquitous.

Senator Frank Church announced his candidacy for the Democratic nomination for president from the porch of the county courthouse in Idaho City in March 1976. His grandfather had settled there in 1871 and his father was born there in 1889. Chase Clark, Church's father-in-law, had announced his candidacy for governor in Idaho City in 1940.

Chinese 
Four thousand Chinese people lived in the Idaho Territory from 1869 to 1875. Like many Chinese immigrants, they came to “Gold Mountain” to work as miners, or found work as laundrymen and cooks. The store of Pon Yam, a prominent Chinese businessman Pon Yam House from 1867 is one of the only remaining buildings from Idaho City's Chinese. Although today Chinese are rarely seen except as tourists, the 1870 census reported at 1,751 Chinese who were nearly half of city residents. Annie Lee was one legendary Idaho city woman who like Polly Bemis, escaped from sexual slavery. She escaped from a member of the Yeong Wo Company in the 1870s to Boise to marry her lover, another Chinese man. Charged by her owner with grand larceny, she told a judge that she wanted to stay in Boise City. The judge subsequently granted her freedom.

Geography and climate

Idaho City experiences a fairly typical Inland Northwest continental Mediterranean climate (Köppen Dsb) with cold, snowy winters and warm, dry summers, typified throughout by large diurnal temperature variations.

Demographics

2010 census
As of the census of 2010, there were 485 people, 216 households, and 124 families residing in the city. The racial makeup of the city was 94.2% White, 1.6% Native American, 0.8% Asian, 0.6% from other races, and 2.7% from two or more races. Hispanic or Latino of any race were 4.9% of the population.

There were 216 households, of which 28.2% had children under the age of 18 living with them, 43.5% were married couples living together, 9.7% had a female householder with no husband present, 4.2% had a male householder with no wife present, and 42.6% were non-families. 37.0% of all households were made up of individuals, and 11.1% had someone living alone who was 65 years of age or older. The average household size was 2.25 and the average family size was 2.97.

The median age in the city was 42.2 years. 23.9% of residents were under the age of 18; 6.5% were between the ages of 18 and 24; 22.6% were from 25 to 44; 34.1% were from 45 to 64; and 13% were 65 years of age or older. The gender makeup of the city was 51.1% male and 48.9% female.

2000 census
As of the census of 2000, there were 458 people, 191 households, and 119 families residing in the city. The racial makeup of the city was 92.36% White, 3.06% Native American, 0.87% Asian, 0.66% from other races, and 3.06% from two or more races. Hispanic or Latino of any race were 1.53% of the population.

There were 191 households, out of which 34.6% had children under the age of 18 living with them, 46.1% were married couples living together, 12.0% had a female householder with no husband present, and 37.2% were non-families. 30.9% of all households were made up of individuals, and 5.8% had someone living alone who was 65 years of age or older. The average household size was 2.38 and the average family size was 3.00.

In the city, the population was spread out, with 29.3% under the age of 18, 6.1% from 18 to 24, 28.4% from 25 to 44, 28.4% from 45 to 64, and 7.9% who were 65 years of age or older. The median age was 37 years. For every 100 females, there were 97.4 males. For every 100 females age 18 and over, there were 95.2 males.

The median income for a household in the city was $28,068, and the median income for a family was $33,295. Males had a median income of $25,750 versus $20,000 for females. The per capita income for the city was $13,370. About 17.3% of families and 19.3% of the population were below the poverty line, including 28.7% of those under age 18 and 5.9% of those age 65 or over.

Political representation

Idaho City is included in Idaho's 1st congressional district and has been represented by Republican Russ Fulcher since 2019.

The current mayor is Phillip J. Canody.

Population history

 1863: 6,275
 1864: 7,000

Transportation
 - SH-21 to Boise (south) and Stanley (north)

The city is served by State Highway 21, a two-lane undivided highway that connects to Boise to the southwest. To the northeast, it continues on to Lowman and Stanley.

References

External links
 Idaho City Chamber of Commerce
 Idaho City Photo Essay

Cities in Boise County, Idaho
Cities in Idaho
County seats in Idaho
Boise metropolitan area
Boot Hill cemeteries